This is a list of companies founded by Harvard University alumni, including attendees who enrolled in degree programs at Harvard University but did not eventually graduate. Companies founded by alumni of Radcliffe College ("Harvard Annex", 1879-1999) are not included in this list. This list is not exhaustive, as it only includes notable companies of which the founding and development history is well recorded by reliable sources. In particular, subsidiaries are listed with their owners in parentheses.

Harvard is a highly successful university in attracting funding for start-up companies, and its alumni have created a large number of companies. According to PitchBook, from 2006 to 2017, Harvard produced 844 company founders as alumni or current students, creating 750 companies, fourth most among all universities in the world.

In this list, founders of a company which merged with other companies to form a new company are counted as founders of the new company. However, founders of a company which later dissolved into several successor companies are not counted as founders of those successor companies; this same rule applies to spin-off companies. Finally, a defunct company is a company that had stopped functioning completely (e.g., bankrupt) without dissolving, merging or being acquired.

Top companies by revenues

Fortune Global 500 (2017) 
This list shows companies in Fortune Global 500 founded or co-founded by Harvard alumni. The cut-off revenue for 2017 Fortune Global 500 companies is $21,609M in 2016.

*: Merger of different companies, at least one of which was founded by Harvard alumni.

Fortune 1000 (2017) 
This list shows companies in Fortune 1000 (only for companies within the U.S.) founded or co-founded by Harvard alumni. The cut-off revenue for 2017 Fortune 1000 companies was $1,791M in 2016.

*: Merger of different companies, at least one of which was founded by Harvard alumni.

**: Fidelity Investments, Bloomberg L.P., and Boston Consulting Group are not listed in Fortune 1000. Their revenues are provided by Forbes.

Former Fortune-listed companies 
For each company, only the latest rankings (up to three years) are shown in this list.

Timeline

Index 
This index also contains companies listed in section "Notable defunct & dissolved".

2000–present

1980–99

1960–79

1900–59

Before 1900

Notable defunct & dissolved

See also 

 List of companies founded by MIT alumni
 List of companies founded by Stanford University alumni
 List of companies founded by UC Berkeley alumni
 List of companies founded by University of Pennsylvania alumni
 List of Harvard University people

References 

Harvard University
Harvard University alumni